Tamazight TV (tifinagh:ⵜⴰⵎⴰⵣⵉⵖⵜ), also known as Amazigh TV, is a Moroccan public television TV channel, and the first exclusively Tamazight television network. It is a part of the state-owned SNRT Group along with Al Aoula, Arryadia, Athaqafia, Al Maghribia, Assadissa, Aflam TV and Laayoune TV. After initial planning in 2006, the channel was launched on 6 January 2010. The channel's objective is to promote and preserve the Amazigh culture in Morocco and in the North Africa region. Programming is in Tachelhit, Tarifit and Central Atlas Tamazight.

History 
The launch of Tamazight TV followed complaints by Amazigh rights organizations regarding the exclusion of Amazigh programming on Moroccan television. A joint statement was issued in 2008; that year, the Moroccan government committed a budget of 500 million dirhams, or about 65 mililon USD, for the network.

The launch was met with mostly positive reception by Amazigh citizens, with a representative of the Amazigh Citizenship Network calling it "a kind of reconciliation with the Amazigh."

References

External links

Tamazight TV at LyngSat Address

Berber-language mass media
Television stations in Morocco
Société Nationale de Radiodiffusion et de Télévision
Television channels and stations established in 2010
2010 establishments in Morocco